Sergey Fedoroff (1925 in Latvia – 2012 in Canada) was a researcher in tissue cultures, who helped establish that it was impossible to regenerate nerve cells. He was president of the Pan American Association of Anatomy from 1975 to 1978.

References 
 Losardo, R. J.; Cruz-Gutiérrez, R.; Prates, J. C.; Moscovici, M.; Rodríguez-Torres, A.; Arteaga-Martínez M.: Sergey Fedoroff: A Pioneer of the Neuronal Regeneration. Tribute from the Pan American Association of Anatomy. International Journal of Morphology, 2015; 33 (2): 794–800.

External links 
Biography of Sergey Fedoroff

1925 births
2012 deaths
Canadian anatomists